Ocularia abyssinica is a species of beetle in the family Cerambycidae. It was described by Pierre Téocchi, Jiroux and Jérôme Sudre in 2004.

References

Oculariini
Beetles described in 2004